Schwebheim is a municipality in the district of Schweinfurt in Bavaria, Germany.  Historically important as the location of the Bibra family castle by the same name.  The castle was heavily damaged during severe bombings of Schweinfurt in World War II and only partially repaired.  Today, the village is fast becoming a suburb of nearby Schweinfurt.

Sons & Daughters of the Town
Ernst von Bibra (1806–1878), botanist, zoologist, metallurgist, chemist, geographer, travel writer, novelist, duellist, art collector and trailblazer in ethnopsychopharmacology
Abraham Adler (1850–1922), Economist

References

External links
  

Schweinfurt (district)
Bibra family